The Good Friday prayer for the Jews is an annual prayer in the Christian, particularly Roman Catholic, liturgy. It is one of several petitions, known in the Catholic Church as the Solemn Intercessions and in the Episcopal Church (United States) as the Solemn Collects, that are made in the Good Friday service for various classes and stations of peoples: for the Church; for the pope; for bishops, priests and deacons; for the faithful; for catechumens; for other Christians; for the Jews; for others who do not believe in Christ; for those who do not believe in God; for those in public office; and for those in special need. These prayers are ancient, predating the eighth century at least (as they are found in the Gelasian Sacramentary).

Roman Catholicism

Background
In the early 1920s, the Clerical Association of Friends of Israel, a Catholic organization founded in 1926 to foster positive attitudes toward Jews and to pray for their conversion to Christianity, requested that the phrase "perfidious Jews" be removed from the liturgy. Pope Pius XI was reportedly strongly in favour of the change and asked the Congregation of Rites to review the matter. Cardinal Alfredo Ildefonso Schuster, who was among the Friends of Israel, was appointed to monitor this issue. The Roman Curia, however, is reported to have reacted very negatively to the proposal on the basis that if one change was made to the old liturgy it would invite other such proposals. The Congregation for the Doctrine of the Faith dissolved the association on 25 March 1928.

Changes by Pius XII
After World War II, Eugenio Zolli, the former Chief Rabbi of Rome and a convert to Roman Catholicism, asked Pope Pius XII to excise the adjective "perfidis" from the prayer for the Jews. Professor Jules Isaac, a French scholar of Catholic-Jewish relations, did so as well in an audience with Pius in 1949. Pius responded with a public declaration that the Latin word "perfidus" means "unbelieving", not "perfidious" or "treacherous". Fifteen years later, Pope John XXIII made that change official.

The form used before 1955 read as follows:

At that time, the congregants did not kneel during the prayer for the conversion of the Jews (even though moments of kneeling in silent prayer were prescribed for all of the other petitions in the Good Friday rite), because, as the famous liturgist Dom Prosper Guéranger, O.S.B., said:
Here [at this prayer] the deacon does not invite the faithful to kneel. The Church has no hesitation in offering up a prayer for the descendants of Jesus' executioners; but in doing so she refrains from genuflecting, because this mark of adoration was turned by the Jews into an insult against our Lord during the Passion. She prays for His scoffers; but she shrinks from repeating the act wherewith they scoffed at Him.

Others disagreed with this explanation; the Russian-Jewish historian Solomon Lurie wrote in his 1922 book on antisemitism in antiquity that this explanation was arbitrary and ad hoc invented: according to the Gospels, it was the Roman soldiers, not the Jews, who mocked Christ. Lurie quotes Kane who wrote that "all authors tried to justify the practice that had existed before them, not to introduce the new one. Apparently this practice (of not kneeling) had been established as a result of the populist antisemitism."

As part of his major revision of the Holy Week liturgy in 1955, Pope Pius XII instituted kneeling for this petition as at the other petitions of the litany, so that the prayer read:

Changes by John XXIII
On 21 March 1959, Pope John XXIII ordered that the word "faithless" be removed from the prayer for the conversion of the Jews, This word had caused much trouble in recent times because of misconceptions that the Latin perfidis was equivalent to "perfidious", giving birth to the view that the prayer accused the Jews of treachery (perfidy), though the Latin word is more correctly translated as "faithless" or "unbelieving". Accordingly, the prayer was revised to read:

John XXIII demonstrated his commitment to the change during the Good Friday service in St. Peter's Basilica in April 1963. When the canon reciting the eight prayers included the word "perfidis" when chanting the Prayer for the Jews, the seventh prayer, the Pope signaled for the liturgy to stop and then had the sequence of prayers repeated from the beginning with the word omitted.

Changes after Vatican II
After the Second Vatican Council, the prayer was completely revised for the 1970 edition of the Roman Missal. The 1973 ICEL English translation of the revised prayer, which was to be retained in the rejected 1998 version,  is as follows:

Changes by Benedict XVI
On 7 July 2007, the Vatican released Pope Benedict XVI's motu proprio entitled, Summorum Pontificum which permitted more widespread celebration of Mass according to the "Missal promulgated by Pope John XXIII in 1962".  The universal permission given to priests by Pope Benedict XVI in 2007 to use the 1962 Roman Missal both privately and, under certain conditions, with a congregation was followed by complaints from Jewish groups and some Catholic leaders over what they perceived as a return to a supersessionist theology that they saw expressed in the 1960 prayer. In response to the complaints, Pope Benedict amended the Good Friday prayer. On 6 February 2008, the Vatican newspaper, L'Osservatore Romano, published a note of the Secretariat of State announcing that Pope Benedict XVI had amended the Good Friday prayer for the Jews contained in the 1962 Roman Missal, and decreeing that the amended text "be used, beginning from the current year, in all celebrations of the Liturgy of Good Friday according to the aforementioned Missale Romanum".

The new prayer reads as follows:

Even the new formulation met with reservations from groups such as the Anti-Defamation League. They considered the removal of "blindness" and "immersion in darkness" with respect to the Jews an improvement over the original language in the Tridentine Mass, but saw no reason why the prayer in the rite as revised by Paul VI was not used instead.

Renewed debate
Jewish reactions to Benedict's authorization underlined their concern that the traditional formulation, which Jews felt offensive, would be more broadly used.

In the form in which they appear in the 1962 Missal, the set of prayers in which that of the Jews is included are for: the Holy Church, the Supreme Pontiff; all orders and grades of the faithful (clergy and laity); public officials (added in 1955, replacing an older prayer for the Holy Roman Emperor, not used since the abdication of Francis II in 1806 but still printed in the Roman Missal); catechumens; the needs of the faithful; heretics and schismatics; the conversion of the Jews (without the word "perfidis"); the conversion of pagans.

In later editions of the Missal, the prayers are for: the Church; the Pope, the clergy and laity of the Church; those preparing for baptism; the unity of Christians, the Jewish people; those who do not believe in Christ; those who do not believe in God; all in public office; those in special need.

The Anti-Defamation League (ADL) complained about the document because the 1962 text for Good Friday includes the request asking God to "lift the veil" from Jewish hearts and to show mercy "to the Jews also." The ADL called the motu proprio Summorum Pontificum "a theological setback in the religious life of Catholics and a body blow to Catholic-Jewish relations, after 40 years of progress between the Church and the Jewish people."  Monsignor Dennis Mikulanis, vicar for inter-religious and ecumenical affairs for the Roman Catholic diocese of San Diego, responded to the ADL saying that "the Church has not restored antisemitic language."  Mikalanis said that the ADL jumped the gun by issuing a statement before the official document had been released and not understanding it.  Mikalanis stated that the previous "antisemitic wording from the liturgy" had already been removed from this missal.  A letter from the Vatican stated, "Several media reports erroneously contend that the letter could in effect reinstate a prayer offensive to Jews from the Good Friday liturgy of the Tridentine Mass, which dates back to 1570."  The Latin Mass before 1959 contained a reference to "the Jews, who do not have the Faith", which was deleted in 1959 and does not appear in the missal being permitted by Summorum Pontificum.

After having some time to study Summorum Pontificum and its implications for the Jewish point of view, Abraham Foxman, the National Director of the ADL, reiterated its previously-stated position. Foxman wrote, "The wider use of the Latin Mass will make it more difficult to implement the doctrines of Vatican II and Pope John Paul II, and could even set in motion retrograde forces within the church on the subject of the Jews, none of which are in the interest of either the church or the Jewish people."  He goes on to reiterate that the problem lies with a prayer that calls for the conversion of the Jews that "was removed by Paul VI in 1970".

At the same time, Foxman emphasized that "the Vatican is not an enemy of the Jewish people, nor is Pope Benedict XVI." Rather, he wrote, "the current controversy speaks to the need for direct and honest communication based on the friendly relations that have evolved. The church must be true to itself and its teachings, and it must understand that reintroducing this prayer – it was removed by Paul VI in 1970 and replaced with a positive one recognizing the Jews' eternal covenant with God – will play into the hands of those who are against better relations between Jews and Catholics."

Although the 1962 version does not include the phrase deemed most offensive, it is still criticized by some as a prayer that explicitly asks for the conversion of Jews to the Catholic faith of Christ.

Cardinal Avery Dulles responded that the Church has a "God-given responsibility to proclaim Christ to all the world. Peter on Pentecost Sunday declared that the whole house of Israel should know for certain that Jesus is Lord and Messiah and that every one of his hearers should be baptized in Jesus' name. Paul spent much of his ministry proclaiming the Gospel to Jews throughout the diaspora. Distressed by their incredulity, he was prepared to wish himself accursed for the sake of their conversion."

The tradition of praying for various groups and purposes dates back to the Early Church. Roman Catholics believe that on Good Friday in particular, they must acknowledge their common fallen nature, and that Jesus died for all. Catholics have long prayed for many classes of people, both inside and outside the church: for the Church as a whole, for the Pope, for the Hierarchy and the People (regular and lay), for the Emperor, for Catechumens, for Various Needs, for Heretics, for Schismatics, for the Jews, and for Pagans, wishing that all be called to conversion in Christ.

Given that, according to the rubrics of both the 1962 and the 1970 Missals, there can be only one celebration of the Good Friday liturgy in each church, the ordinary form of the Roman Rite (i.e. the post-1970 form, which omits the images of the veil and of blindness) is the one to be used almost everywhere.

Some have argued that the Good Friday prayers are liturgically similar to the Jewish prayers Birkat haMinim or the Aleinu or the Hagaddah, although this is controversial.

The American Jewish Committee (AJC), on the other hand, expressed "its appreciation to Pope Benedict XVI for his confirmation that the positive changes of Vatican II will apply to his recent decision regarding the Latin Mass, which has been reinstated by the Church". Rabbi David Rosen, the AJC's international director of Interreligious Affairs stated: "We acknowledge that the Church’s liturgy is an internal Catholic matter and this motu proprio from Pope Benedict XVI is based on the permission given by John Paul II in 1988 and thus, on principle, is nothing new". The statement by the committee, after acknowledging the said quote from its president, affirmed: "However we are naturally concerned about how wider use of this Tridentine liturgy may impact upon how Jews are perceived and treated. Pope Benedict XVI, in a decree issued on Saturday, authorized wider use of the traditional Latin Mass, which in some liturgy contains language offensive to Jews. We appreciate that the motu proprio actually limits the use of the Latin Mass in the days prior to Easter, which addresses the reference in the Good Friday liturgy concerning the Jews (...) However, it is still not clear that this qualification applies to all situations and we have called on the Vatican to contradict the negative implications that some in the Jewish community and beyond have drawn concerning the motu proprio."

In the May/June 2007 issue of its newsletter, the Committee on the Liturgy of the United States Conference of Catholic Bishops (USCCB) published an unofficial English translation of Summorum Pontificum and its cover letter, together with commentary in the form of footnotes and 20 questions and answers. Answer # 14 addresses the question of anti-Semitism:

Throughout his papacy, John Paul II worked to reconcile the Church with the Jewish people and to strengthen new bonds of friendship. In 1988, Pope John Paul II gave permission for the Mass to be celebrated according to the Missale Romanum of 1962 only as a pastoral provision to assist Catholics who remained attached to the previous rites, thereby hoping to develop closer bonds with the family of the Church.

In 2007 Pope Benedict XVI extended such permission for wider pastoral application, but he remained committed to "the need to overcome past prejudices, misunderstandings, indifference and the language of contempt and hostility [and to continue] the Jewish-Christian dialogue…to enrich and deepen the bonds of friendship which have developed".

2011 prayer (Ordinary Form)
As part of the ICEL English translation of the third edition of the Roman Missal, the 1970 prayer was retranslated as follows:
Let us pray also for the Jewish people, to whom the Lord our God spoke first, that he may grant them to advance in love of his name and in faithfulness to his covenant. (Prayer in silence. Then the Priest says:) Almighty ever-living God, who bestowed your promises on Abraham and his descendants, hear graciously the prayers of your Church, that the people you first made your own may attain the fullness of redemption. Through Christ our Lord. Amen.
Since 2011, this version of the prayer is the only English version authorized for use in the ordinary form of the Roman Rite.

Eastern Churches
The service of Vespers on Great Friday in the Eastern Orthodox Church and Byzantine Catholic churches uses the expression "impious and transgressing people", but the strongest expressions are in the Orthros of Great Friday, which includes the same phrase, but also speaks of "the murderers of God, the lawless nation of the Jews" and referring to "the assembly of the Jews", prays: "But give them, O Lord, their reward, for they devised vain things against Thee."  As of 2015, the Ukrainian Greco-Catholic Church was still using the term "lawless synagogue" in their Great Friday Vespers.

In 2007, a group of twelve Eastern Orthodox priests representing five different national churches, some in open defiance of directives from their church leadership, issued a ten-page declaration calling for the removal all liturgical passages they considered anti-Semitic.

Anglican Communion
The third of the Solemn Collects in the 1662 Book of Common Prayer of the Church of England is as follows:

O merciful God, who hast made all men, and hatest nothing that thou hast made, nor wouldest the death of any sinner, but rather that he be converted and live; Have mercy upon all Jews, Turks, Infidels, and Heretics, and take from them all ignorance, hardness of heart, and contempt of thy Word; and so fetch them home, blessed Lord, to thy flock, that they may be saved among the remnant of the true Israelites, and be made one fold under one shepherd, Jesus Christ our Lord, who liveth and reigneth with thee and the Holy Spirit, one God, world without end. Amen.

Canon XIV of the Anglican Church of Canada provides for the deletion of this collect in the Canadian prayerbook. The 1928 revision of the prayer book of the Episcopal Church in the United States of America replaced "all Jews, Turks, Infidels, and Heretics" with "all who know thee not as thou art revealed in the Gospel of thy Son."

The 1979 edition contains this prayer:
Merciful God, creator of all the peoples of the earth and lover of souls: Have compassion on all who do not know you as you are revealed in your Son Jesus Christ; let your Gospel be preached with grace and power to those who have not heard it; turn the hearts of those who resist it; and bring home to your fold those who have gone astray; that there may be one flock under one shepherd, Jesus Christ our Lord.

See also
Christianity and antisemitism
Conversion of the Jews
Improperia
Christian–Jewish reconciliation
Birkat haMinim

References
 Andrea Nicolotti, Perfidia iudaica. Le tormentate vicende di un'orazione liturgica prima e dopo Erik Peterson, in G. Caronello (ed.), Erik Peterson. La presenza teologica di un outsider, Città del Vaticano, Libreria Editrice Vaticana, 2012, pp. 477–514.
"Medieval Jewish civilization", Norman Roth, Taylor & Francis, 2003,

Notes

Further reading
« Benoît XVI et la "prière pour les Juifs". Retour sur une polémique judéo-chrétienne récente », by Pierre Savy
Jewish-Christian Relations

Holy Week
Catholicism and Judaism
Christian anti-Judaism
Catholicism-related controversies
Judaism-related controversies